Ross and Cromarty, also referred to as Ross-shire and Cromartyshire, is a variously defined area in the Highlands and Islands of Scotland. Historically there has also been a constituency of the Parliament of the United Kingdom (1832 to 1983), a local government county (1890 to 1975), a district of the Highland local government region (1975 to 1996) and a management area of the Highland Council (1996 to 2007). The local government county is now divided between two local government areas: the Highland area and Na h-Eileanan Siar (the Western Isles). Ross and Cromarty border Sutherland to the north and Inverness-shire to the south.

The county was formed by the uniting of the shires of Ross-shire and Cromartyshire. Both these shires had themselves been formed from the historic province of Ross, out of which the many enclaves and exclaves that formed Cromartyshire were carved out, leaving the remaining area to become Ross-shire. These parcels of land were for many purposes administered as part of Ross-shire rather than Cromartyshire. The county also included the Isle of Lewis, however this is not part of the modern lieutenancy area (which instead includes the Isle of Skye), although Lewis is part of the current registration county.

Geography

Western Ross and Cromarty, also known as Wester Ross, is typified by its mountainous Highland scenery, especially the Torridon Hills which includes such peaks as Beinn Eighe and Liathach. It contains a long, fractured coastline along The Minch and Inner Sound (opposite Skye), consisting of a number of isolated peninsulas split by sea lochs; from north to south the chief of these are Coigach, Loch Broom, the Scoraig peninsula, Little Loch Broom, Gruinard Bay, Rubha Mòr peninsula, Loch Ewe, Rua Reidh/Melvaig peninsula, Loch Gairloch, Loch Torridon, Applecross peninsula, Loch Kishorn, Loch Carron, Lochalsh peninsula, Loch Long, Loch Duich and the Glenelg peninsula which is shared with Inverness-shire.

The eastern half (Easter Ross) is generally flatter, and consists of  towns, villages and farmland bordering the Moray Firth. In the north Dornoch Firth separates the county from Sutherland; near the Dornoch Firth Bridge lies the thin, tapering Ness of Portnaculter peninsula. In the north-east can be found the hammerhead-shaped Tarbat peninsula; across Cromarty Firth lies the Black Isle (actually a peninsula not an island). To the south-east Beauly Firth forms the border with Inverness-shire.

The county contains numerous lochs, the most prominent of these being Loch Ailsh, Crom Loch, Loch a' Choire Mhòir, Loch Fada, Lochan Gaineamhaich, Loch Cluanie, Loch Loyne, Loch Monar, Loch Mullardoch, Loch a' Bhealaich, Loch nan Eun, Loch na Leitreach, Loch an Laoigh, Loch Calavie, An Gead Loch, Loch an Tachdaidh, Loch Sgamhain, Loch a' Chroisg, Loch Clair, Loch Coulin, Loch Fhiarlaid, Loch Dughaill, Loch Coultrie, Loch Damph, Loch Lundie, Loch na A-Oidhche, Loch Maree, Loch a' Ghodhainn, Loch Ghaineamhach, Loch Bad an Sgalaig, Loch a' Bhraoin, Loch Fannich, Fionn Loch, Loch na Sealga, Loch Eye, Loch Glass, Loch Morie, Loch Ussie, Loch Achilty, Loch Garve, Loch Luichart, Loch Achanalt, Loch Meig, Loch Droma, Loch Glascarnoch, Loch Coire Làir, Loch Vaich, Loch a' Chaorunn, Loch na Caoidhe, Loch Beannacharain, Loch na Totaig, Loch Osgaig, Loch Raa, Loch Vatachan, Fionn Loch, Loch Veyatie, Loch Lurgainn, Loch Bad a' Ghaill, Loch Sionascaig, Lochan Tuath, Loch an Doire Duibh, Loch Doire na h-Airbhe, Loch a Ghille, Loch Buine Mhòire, Loch Call an Uidhean, Loch a' Chroisg, Loch Achall, Loch an Daimh, Loch na Maoile, Loch Ob an Lochain, Clar Lochan, Loch an Eilein and the Orrin Reservoir.

Lewis is the northern part of Lewis and Harris, the largest island of the Outer Hebrides and the third largest in the British Isles after Britain and Ireland. Due to its flatter, more fertile land, Lewis contains three-quarters of the population of the Western Isles, and the largest settlement, Stornoway. To the west lie the isolated and uninhabited Flannan Isles.

Islands

Mainland

A' Ghlas-Leac
An Garbh-Eilean
Black Islands
Crowlin Islands
Eilean a' Chait
Eilean a' Mhal
Eilean an Inbhire Bhàin
Eilean an t-Sratha
Eilean Bàn
Eilean Chuaig
Eilean Dubh Dhurinis
Eilean Furadh Mòr
Eilean Horrisdale
Eilean Mòineseach 
Eilean Mòr
Eilean na Bà
Eilean na Bà Mòr
Eilean na Beinne
Eilean na Creige Duibhe
Eilean nam Feannag
Eilean nan Naomh
Eilean Stacan
Eilean Tioram
Eileanan Dubha
Fraoch Eilean
Fraoch Eilean Mòr
Fraoachlan
Glas Eilean
Green Island
Gruinard Island
Isle of Ewe
Kishorn Island
Làrach Tigh Mhic Dhomhnuill
Longa Island
Sgeir a' Bhuic
Sgeir a' Ghair
Sgeir an Araig
Sgeir an Fheòir
Sgeir Bhuide
Sgeir Bhuidhe
Sgeir Chreagach
Sgeir Dùghaill
Sgeir Fhada
Sgeir Ghlas
Sgeir Maol Mhoraidh
Sgeir Maol Mhoraidh Shuas
Sgeir Mhòr
Sgeir na Trian
Shieldaig Island
Strome Islands
Summer Isles
Ulluva

Lewis

Àird Orasaigh
Bearasaigh
Bhuaile Mhòr
Bràighe Mòr
Bratanais Mòr
Campaigh
Ceabagh
Ceabhaigh
Cealasaigh
Cliatasaigh
Craigeam
Cruitear
Cùl Campaigh
Eilean a' Bhlàir
Eilean an Tighe
Eilean Àrnol
Eilean Beag a' Bhàigh
Eilean Bhàcasaigh
Eilean Bhinndealaim
Eilean Chearstaigh
Eilean Chalaibrigh
Eilean Chaluim Cille
Eilean Cheòis
Eilean Dubh a' Bhàigh
Eilean Fir Chrothair
Eilean Liubhaird
Eilean Mhealasta
Eilean Molach
Eilean Mòr a' Bhàigh
Eilean Mòr Lacasaidh
Eilean Mòr Phabail
Eilean nan Uan
Eilean Orasaidh
Eilean Orasaigh
Eilean Rosaidh
Eilean Sgarastaigh
Eilean Shìophoirt
Eilean Teinis
Eilean Thinngartsaigh
Eilean Thòraidh
Eilean Thuilm
Eilean Trosdam
Eughlam
Eunaigh Mòr
Flannan Isles
Fleisgeir
Flodaigh, Lewis
Flodaigh (Outer Loch Ròg)
Fuaigh Beag
Fuaigh Mòr
Garbh Eilean
Geile Sgeir
Glas Sgeir
Gousam
Great Bernera
Grèineam
Hairsgeir Beag
Hairsgeir Mòr
Lada Sgeir
Langaisgeir Mòr
Lewis (part of the larger Lewis and Harris island)
Linngeam
Liongam
Lìth Sgeir
Little Bernera
Màs Sgeir
Pabaigh Beag
Pabaigh Mòr
Riosaigh
Seanna Chnoc
Sgeir a' Mhurain
Sgeir Dhail
Sgeir Dhearg
Sgeir Ghlas Bheag
Sgeir Ghobhlach
Sgeir Leathann
Sgeir Liath
Sgeir Mhòr Shildinis
Sgeir Mol Srupair
Sgeir Sgianailt
Sgeir Tanais
Sgeirean An Arbhair
Shiant Islands
Siaram Bostadh
Siaram Mòr
Tabhaigh Bheag
Tabhaigh Mhòr
Tamna
Tanaraigh
Tannaraidh
Thalta Sgeir
Vacsay (Bhàcasaigh in Gaelic)

North Rona

Ghealldraig Mhòr
Gralisgeir
Lisgear Mhòr
North Rona
Sula Sgeir
Thamna Sgeir

Economy and population

The main economic activities in Ross and Cromarty are crofting, fishing and tourism. The population as of 2001 was 49,967.

Parliamentary constituency
The name Ross and Cromarty was first used for the Ross and Cromarty county constituency of the Parliament of the United Kingdom from 1832 to 1983. As created in 1832, the constituency merged two former county constituencies: the Ross-shire constituency and the Cromartyshire constituency, and it elected a Member of Parliament to represent the counties of Ross-shire and Cromartyshire, minus their parliamentary burghs, Dingwall, Tain and Fortrose, which were represented as components of the Wick burghs constituency and the Inverness burghs constituency.

Constituency boundaries were altered in 1918, by the Representation of the People Act 1918, and the Ross and Cromarty constituency acquired the boundaries of the county of Ross and Cromarty, including the former parliamentary burghs, but minus Stornoway and Lewis, which became part of a new constituency, the Western Isles constituency.

In 1983, the Ross, Cromarty and Skye constituency was created to represent the then Ross and Cromarty district and Skye and Lochalsh district. The Kincardine area joined the Caithness and Sutherland constituency.

Local government

County

The local government county of Ross and Cromarty was created in 1890 under the Local Government (Scotland) Act 1889, with boundaries similar to, but not exactly the same as, the boundaries of the constituency. Ross and Cromarty County Council was based at County Buildings in Dingwall.

The county continued with largely unchanged boundaries until its abolition in 1975. When the county was abolished in 1975, the mainland part became part of the new Highland region, and Lewis became part of the Western Isles islands area.

District
In 1975 the mainland part of the former county was effectively divided between three districts of the Highland region. Most of the former county became the new district of Ross and Cromarty. The Lochalsh area joined the Skye and Lochalsh district and the Kincardine area joined the Sutherland district. The district was abolished in 1996.

Since 1996
The wards in the former district of Ross and Cromarty formed the management area of Ross and Cromarty from 1996 to 1999, and again from 1999 to 2007. The name was not used for a management area after 2007, although some local decisions are delegated to the Ross and Cromarty area committee, which consists of all Highland councillors representing Ross and Cromarty.

Civil parishes 
In the medieval period the area was divided into the following civil and ecclesiastical parishes:

 Alness
 Avoch
 Barvas (on the Isle of Lewis)
 Contin
 Cromarty
 Cullicudden
 Dingwall or Inverferan
 Edderton
 Fearn
 Fodderty
 Gairloch
 Kilchrist or Tarradale
 Killearnan aka Ederdour
 Kilmuir Easter
 Kilmuir Wester
 Kiltearn
 Kincardine
 Kinnettes
 Kintail
 Kirkmichael
 Lemlair
 Lochalsh
 Lochbroom
 Lochcarron
 Lochs (on the Isle of Lewis)
 Logie Easter
 Logie Wester or Logiebride
 Nigg
 Nonakiln
 Rosemarkie
 Rosskeen
 Stornoway or Eye (on the Isle of Lewis)
 Suddy
 Tain
 Tarbat
 Uig (on the Isle of Lewis)
 Urquhart
 Urray

Changes took place in the post-Reformation period. The parish of Applecross was created in 1726 out of part of the parish of Lochcarron. The parishes of Kilmuir Wester and Suddy were united in 1750 to form the parish of Knockbain. The parishes of Urquhart and Logie Wester were united in 1845. The parish of Glenshiel was created out of part of Kintail c. 1750.

Kilchrist was absorbed into Urray in 1574.

Lemlair was absorbed into Kiltearn in 1618. Nonakiln was absorbed into Rosskeen c. 1714. Kinnettes was absorbed into Fodderty c. C16th. The parishes of Cullicudden and Kirkmichael were united c. 1700 to form the parish of Resolis.

Registration county
The registration county of Ross and Cromarty, used for land registry purposes, covers the area of the former county of Ross and Cromarty, including Lewis.

Lieutenancy area
Lieutenancy areas are subdivisions used for the ceremonial lord lieutenants, the monarch's representatives. The Ross and Cromarty lieutenancy area combines the areas of two former districts of the Highland region: Ross and Cromarty, and Skye and Lochalsh. The area therefore includes the mainland part of the registration county and former administrative county of Ross and Cromarty, excluding Kincardine, with the addition of the Isle of Skye, which is in the registration county (and former administrative county) of Inverness-shire.

Transport

The Kyle of Lochalsh railway line traverses the county west–east, terminating at Inverness. The Far North Line goes north–south along the east coast, connecting Inverness in the south with Thurso and Wick in the north.

The Black Isle is connected by bridge to the 'mainland' - Cromarty Bridge in the north-west and the Kessock Bridge in the south-west. At the tip of the peninsula a ferry provides access to the Tarbat peninsula. The Skye Bridge links Kyle of Lochalsh to the isle of Skye.

Various buses operated by Stagecoach Group link the major towns of the east coast, with the 61 bus connecting Ullapool to Inverness. The latter route is also served by Scottish Citylink in the summer, continuing on to Glasgow. Various independent bus companies link the smaller towns of Wester Ross, though online information is limited.

A ferry connects Stornoway on Lewis with Ullapool on the mainland, taking about three hours.

The county contains one airport - Stornoway - which provides passenger flights to destinations within Scotland as well as London Southend.

Settlements

Mainland

Achnasheen
Achiltibuie
Alness
Altandhu
Applecross
Ardgay
Aultbea
Badenscallie
Balintore
Barbaraville
Conon Bridge
Contin
Cromarty
Culrain
Diabaig
Dingwall
Dornie
Dundonnell
Edderton
Evanton
Fearn
Garve
Gairloch
Hill of Fearn
Inver
Invergordon
Inverinate
Jemimaville
Kildary
Kilmuir, Black Isle
Kilmuir, Easter Ross
Kinlochewe
Kyle of Lochalsh
Laide
Lochcarron
Marybank
Maryburgh
Milton
Muir of Ord
Mulbuie
Munlochy
Nigg
North Kessock
Polbain
Polglass
Poolewe
Portmahomack
Reraig
Rieff
Shieldaig
Strathcarron
Strathpeffer
Stromeferry
Tain
Torridon
Ullapool

Isle of Lewis

Achmore
Adabrock
Aignish
Aird
Aird Uig
Airidhbhruaich
Arnol
Back
Balallan
Ballantrushal
Barvas
Borve
Bragar
Branahuie
Brue
Breaclete
Breanish
Breasclete
Calbost
Callanish
Carishader
Carloway
Caverstay
Cliff
Coll
Cromore
Cross
Crossbost
Crowlista
Dalbeg
Eagleton
Eorodale
Eoropie
Fivepenny
Flesherin
Garynahine
Garyvard
Geishader
Gisla
Gravir
Gress
Grimshader
Habost
Hacklete
Holm
Islivik
Keose
Keose Glebe
Kershader
Kirkibost
Kneep
Knockaird
Laxay
Laxdale
Lemreway
Leurbost
Lionel
Lower Bayble
Mangursta
Marvig
Marybank
Meavik
Melbost
Newmarket
Newvalley
North Dell
North Galson
North Tolsta
Orinsay
Parkend
Plasterfield
Portnaguran
Port of Ness
Portvoller
Ranish
Sandwick
Shader
Shawbost
Sheshader
Shieldenish
Shulishader
Skigersta
South Dell
South Galson
Steinish
Stornoway
Swainbost
Timsgarry
Tobson
Tong
Upper Bayble
Valtos

See also
Ross, Scotland
List of counties of Scotland 1890–1975
Medieval Diocese of Ross
Politics of the Highland council area

References

Further reading
D. Alston, Ross and Cromarty : a historical guide (Edinburgh : Birlinn, 1999 ), which, however, restricts itself to coverage of the mainland county;
R. Bain, History of the Ancient Province of Ross (Dingwall, 1899);
J. H. Dixon, Gairloch (Edinburgh, 1888);
F. N. Reid, The Earls of Ross (Edinburgh, 1894);
W. C. Mackenzie, History of the Outer Hebrides (Paisley, 1904).

External links 

Encyclopædia Britannica, Ross and Cromarty

 
Lieutenancy areas of Scotland
Districts of Scotland
Former counties of Scotland